Chouteauoceras is an openly coiled, gyroconic, nautiloid cephalopod from the Mississippian of North America belonging to the Nautilid family Trigonoceratidae, and superfamily Trigonocerataceae.

The whorl section of Chouteauoceras is ovate, higher than it is wide. The surface is covered with numerous longitudinal ridges and fine growth lines. The suture has broad rounded lateral lobes and dorsal and ventral saddles. The siphuncle is small, subcentral.

References

 Kummel, B, 1964;  Nautiloidea- Nautilida; Treatise on Invertebrate Paleontology Part K Nautiloidea; Geological Society of America and University of Kansas Press.

Prehistoric nautiloid genera